Edward Herman Bastian (born June 6, 1957) is an American business executive. He is the ninth and current chief executive officer of Delta Air Lines, serving in this role since May 2, 2016.

Early life and education 
Bastian grew up in Poughkeepsie, New York, the oldest of nine children. His father was a dentist and his mother was a dental assistant. The couple operated a dental practice from within the family home. He graduated from Our Lady of Lourdes High School in Poughkeepsie in 1975.

In 1979, Bastian received a Bachelor of Business Administration in accounting from St. Bonaventure University in Cattaraugus County, New York.

Career 
Bastian began his career as an auditor in New York City at Price Waterhouse, now PricewaterhouseCoopers (PWC). During a 1981 annual review, he uncovered a $50 million fraud scheme involving ad powerhouse J. Walter Thompson. This prompted a U.S. Securities and Exchange Commission investigation, leaving many PWC executives with marred careers. A few years later, Bastian was named partner at age 31.

After PWC, he served as vice president at PepsiCo, where he managed international finances for its Frito-Lay snack division until 1998, when he joined Delta Air Lines as vice president - finance and controller. In 2000, he was promoted to senior vice president – finance and controller.

Bastian left Delta in 2005 to become senior vice president and chief financial officer at Acuity Brands. Six months later, at the request of then-Delta CEO Gerald Grinstein, he returned to the airline to serve as chief financial officer. In 2007, he was appointed to president, a position he held until assuming the role of CEO in May 2016. His transition to CEO was the first time Delta had chosen a chief executive officer from within the company since 1987.

Personal life 
Ed Bastian is married. 
 A father of 4, he splits his time between Atlanta, where Delta Air Lines is headquartered, and Florida.

Awards and recognition 
 In 2021, Bastian will assume the role of Chairman for the Metro Atlanta Chamber of Commerce.
In 2018, Fortune named him to its annual World's 50 Greatest Leaders list.
 On February 17, 2018, Georgia Governor Nathan Deal and the Georgia Historical Society inducted Bastian to the Georgia Trustees, the highest honor an individual can receive from the state.
 In 2017, he was recognized by Glassdoor as a Top CEO, based on employee reviews.
In 2017, Bastian was honored by the Atlanta Business Chronicle as one of Atlanta's Most Admired CEOs.

References 

Living people
1957 births
People from Poughkeepsie, New York
Delta Air Lines people
American airline chief executives
St. Bonaventure University alumni
PricewaterhouseCoopers people
PepsiCo people